The Madygen Formation (Russian: Madygen Svita) is a Late Triassic (Carnian) geologic formation and Lagerstätte in the Batken and Osh Regions of western Kyrgyzstan, with minor outcrops in neighboring Tajikistan and Uzbekistan.

The formation, extending across the Fergana Valley and Fergana Range, is unique for Central Asia, as it represents one of the few known continental deposits and the Madygen Formation is renowned for the preservation of more than 20,000 fossil insects, making it one of the richest Triassic Lagerstätten in the world. Other vertebrate fossils as fish, amphibians, reptiles and synapsids have been recovered from the formation too, as well as minor fossil flora.

The lake sediments of the Lagerstätte provided fossil cartilaginous fishes and their egg capsules and unusual Triassic reptiles like Sharovipteryx and Longisquama. The wide diversity of insect fossils was first discovered in the 1960s and first described by Russian paleontologist Aleksandr Sharov, with a notable example being Gigatitan.

Description 

The Late Triassic layers rest on top of Paleozoic basement with local Permo-Triassic molasse sediments. The section consists of mudstones, sandstones, conglomerates and fanglomerates. This wide variety of siliciclastic rocks reflects the complex spatial and temporal pattern of depositional sub-environments including alluvial fans, sandflats, swamps, back-swamp areas, and littoral to profundal lake zones. The fluvio-lacustrine deposits of the Madygen Formation belong to one of only a few occurrences of continental Triassic beds in Central Asia.

The formation was deposited during the Carnian Pluvial Event (CPE), a global humid event leading to high extinction levels of various groups globally. The CPE led to anoxic conditions, most notably in the South China Block. The area where the Madygen Formation was deposited formed part of the Cimmerian microcontinent, a slab of crust that collided with Laurasia during the Cimmerian orogeny in later Mesozoic times. This orogeny led to the disappearance of the Paleo-Tethys Ocean.

Petroleum geology 
The formation grades from bottom to top from alluvial to fluvial into a thick succession of lacustrine mudstones, followed by an alluvial package, on top of which lacustrine, fluvial, deltaic and alluvial layers were deposited.

The hydrocarbon potential of samples of the Madygen Formation ranges from poor to excellent. The sediments containing more than 0.5% Total Organic Carbon (TOC) may be regarded as sources of gaseous hydrocarbons rather than of oil. The Hydrogen Index (HI) of outcrop samples reaches 100 and the maximum recorded maturity (Ro) is 0.8.

Paleontological significance 
During the 1960s, Russian paleontologists recovered an unusually rich fossil content in the type strata of the Madygen Formation, including abundant macrophytes, more than 20,000 insect remains and unique small reptiles with well preserved soft tissue. Spirorbis-like polychaete worm tubes, crustaceans (ostracods, kazacharthrans, malacostraca), freshwater pelecypods and gastropods are known from shallow to deeper lake environments. Non-aquatic insects are among the most common fossil remains of the Madygen Formation. These include representatives of the orders Ephemeroptera, Odonata, Notoptera, Blattodea, Titanoptera, Ensifera, Caelifera, Rhynchota, Auchenorrhyncha, Stenorrhyncha, Coleoptera, Hymenoptera, Trichoptera and Diptera. Traces of insect larvae are preserved in near-shore lake deposits.

Fish remains mostly represent endemic genera assigned to the actinopterygian families Evenkiidae (Oshia), Palaeoniscidae (Ferganiscus, Sixtelia) and Megaperleidus and Alvinia. The actinopterygian Saurichthys and the dipnoan Asiatoceratodus are cosmopolitan taxa also recorded in the Madygen Formation. Two distinctive elasmobranch egg capsule types, i.e. Palaeoxyris, indicating a small Lissodus- or Lonchidion-like hybodont shark and an indeterminate capsule type, imply the presence of two different elasmobranch species which used the freshwater environments of the Madygen Formation as spawning grounds. Tetrapods are known from a probably larval urodelan (Triassurus), a small procynosuchid cynodont (Madysaurus), a gliding  reptile (Sharovipteryx) and the enigmatic diapsid Longisquama.

Fossil content

Amphibians

Reptiles

Synapsids

Cartilaginous fishes

Fishes 
The following fish fossils were found in the formation:

Arthropods

Flora

Insect fauna correlations 
Progonocimicidae found in the formation are also recorded in the Carnian Los Rastros Formation of Argentina, the Norian Blackstone and Mount Crosby Formations of Australia, and the Norian to Rhaetian Tologoi Formation of Kazakhstan. Permochoristidae are also known from the Carnian Potrerillos and Cacheuta Formations of Argentina, Huangshanjie Formation of China, the Norian Blackstone and Mount Crosby Formations of Australia; the Norian to Rhaetian Tologoi Formation of Kazakhstan, the Sinemurian Dzhil Formation of Kyrgyzstan and the Toarcian Posidonia Shale of Germany.

Orthophlebia had a relatively broad distribution in the Late Triassic as it is also found in the Sinemurian Badaowan Formation of China and Dzhil Formation of Kyrgyzstan, the Pliensbachian Makarova Formation of Russia and Sulyukta Formation of Tajikistan; the Toarcian Whitby Mudstone Formation of England, Posidonia Shale of Germany, and Cheremkhovo Formation of Russia, and the Early Jurassic Kushmurun Formation of Kazakhstan.

Haglidae were also recorded in the Koldzat and Tologoi Formations of Kazakhstan, in the Carnian Cacheutá Formation of Argentina, the Carnian to Norian Molteno Formation of South Africa and Lesotho, and the Norian Mount Crosby Formation of Australia.

See also 

 Carnian formations
 Denmark Hill Insect Bed, insect-bearing unit of Queensland, Australia
 Candelária Formation, lacustrine formation of the Paraná Basin, Brazil
 Ischigualasto Formation, alluvial and fluvial Lagerstätte of Argentina
 Los Rastros Formation, insect-bearing formation underlying the Ischigualasto Formation
 Chinle Formation, fluvio-lacustrine fossiliferous formation of the western United States
 Doswell Formation, continental fossiliferous formation of the eastern United States
 Lossiemouth Sandstone, fossiliferous formation of Scotland

Other Central Asian Lagerstätten
 Bissekty Formation, Turonian formation of Uzbekistan
 Bostobe Formation, Santonian to Campanian formation of Kazakhstan
 Karabastau Formation, Late Jurassic formation of Kazakhstan
 Danata Formation, Paleogene formation of Turkmenistan

References

Bibliography 

 
  
  
 
 
  
 
  
  
 
 
  
  
  
 
 
  
  
 
 
 
 
 
 
 
 
  
 
 
 
 
 
 
 
 

 
Geologic formations of Kyrgyzstan
Geologic formations of Tajikistan
Geologic formations of Uzbekistan
Conglomerate formations
Mudstone formations
Sandstone formations
Alluvial deposits
Deltaic deposits
Fluvial deposits
Lacustrine deposits
Fossiliferous stratigraphic units of Asia
Paleontology in Kyrgyzstan
Formations
Formations